FC Copa is a Swedish football club located in Visby on the island of Gotland.

Background
FC Copa currently plays in Division 4 Gotland which is the sixth tier of Swedish football. They play their home matches at the Visborgsvallen in Visby.

The club is affiliated to Gotlands Fotbollförbund.

Season to season

References

Football clubs in Gotland County